Chandrabose (11 July 1950 – 30 September 2010) was an Indian Tamil language music composer and singer. He has composed music for more than 300 movies between 1977-1995. In 2007 he made his debut on the silver screen as an actor.

Personal life
Chandrabose's son, Bose Santhosh, has also worked in films as a composer, working in the Malayalam film Sandwich (2011) and the Tamil films, Meenkothi and Deva Kumaran.
He is married twice,  since 2007 he started acting in Kalaignar TV serials.

Film composer
He was during the 80s the official composer of the AVM Productions, in particular the Tamil movies, among which some of them starring Rajini Kanth

Filmography

Composer
Films

 Madhurageetham (1977)
 Mangudi Minor (1978)
 Machanai Paatheengala (1978)
 Tharayil Vaazhum Meengal (1979)
 Saranam Ayyappa (1980)
 Vadivangal (1981)
 Parvaiyin Marupakkam (1982)
 Ithu Engal Rajyam (1984)
 Oru Malarin Payanam (1985)
 Rajathi Rojakili (1985)
 Yemaatrathe Yemaaraathe (1985)
 Thandanai (1985)
 Karaiyai Thodatha Alaigal (1985)
 Marumagal (1986)
 Viduthalai (1986)
 Shankar Guru (1987)
 Makkal En Pakkam (1987)
 Manithan (1987)
 Michael Raj (1987)
 Adhu Antha Kaalam (1988)
 Annanagar Mudhal Theru (1988)
 Kadarkarai Thaagam (1988)
 Kai Naattu (1988)
 Kaliyugam (1988)
 Kadhanayagan (1988)
 Thaimel Aanai (1988)
 Paatti Sollai Thattathe (1988)
 Kalicharan (1988)
 En Vazhi Thani Vazhi (1988)
 Nallavan (1988)
 Kazhugumalai Kallan (1988)
 Vasanthi (1988)
 Chinna Chinna Aasaigal (1989)
 Kuttravali (1989)
 Annakili Sonna Kathai (1989)
 Idhaya Deepam (1989)
 Oru Thottil Sabatham (1989)
 Pudhiya Paadhai(1989)
 Sonthakkaran (1989)
 Raja Chinna Roja (1989)
 Vaai Kozhuppu (1989)
 Vettaiyaadu Vilaiyaadu (1989)
 Periya Idathu Pillai (1990)
 Muthalaali Amma (1990)
 Nangal Puthiyavargal (1990)
 Maanagara Kaaval (1991)
 Aboorva Nanbargal (1991)
Mudhal Kural (1991)
Pondatti Sonna Kettukanum (1991)
 Naan Pudicha Maappillai (1991)
 Sugamana Sumaigal (1992)
Ungal Anbu Thangachi (1993)
 Varavu Ettana Selavu Pathana (1994)
 Aval Potta Kolam (1995)
 Naan Petha Magane (1995)
 Sigamani Ramamani (2001)
 Aadhikkam (2005)

Private Albums
1998 "Vegam" - All Songs Penned by Gangai Amaran 
Television
 1997 Aachi International
 1998 Nimmathi Ungal Choice I
 1998 Nimmathi Ungal Choice II - Kannammavin Kadhai
 1998 Oru Pennin Kadhai
 1999 Galatta Kudumbam I
 1999 Sontham
 1999 Nimmathi Ungal Choice III - Thriveni Sangamam
 1999 Galatta Kudumbam II - Galatta Sirippu
 1999 Nimmathi Ungal Choice IV - Mavilai Thoranam
 1999 Mangai
 2001 Take It Easy Vaazhkai
 2007 Porantha Veeda Puguntha Veeda

Singer

Actor
Films
Kathi Kappal (2008)
Television 2006-2007Malargal (Sun TV) as Lingam
 2008Namma Kudumbam (Kalaignar TV)
 2008Jananam (Mega TV)
 2008-2009Vairanenjam (Kalaignar TV) as jagannadhan (dubbed as aadajanma on Star Maa and Swarna manasu on Asianet)
 2009-2010Thiruppavai'' (Sun TV)
 2009-2010 Thangamana Purushan (Kalaignar TV)

References

External links

Indian male songwriters
Indian film score composers
Tamil musicians
2010 deaths
20th-century Indian composers
Indian Tamil people
20th-century Indian singers
Singers from Chennai
1947 births
21st-century Indian singers
Indian male film score composers
21st-century Indian male singers
20th-century Indian male singers